Favorite Story is an American old-time radio dramatic anthology. It was nationally syndicated by the Ziv Company from 1946 to 1949. The program was "advertised as a show that 'stands head and shoulders above the finest programs on the air'". Originating at KFI in Los Angeles, California, Favorite Story apparently was not related to the similarly named My Favorite Story that ran on KNX in Los Angeles earlier.

Format
Each episode of Favorite Story featured an adaptation of a story selected by a celebrity — purportedly his or her favorite story. The celebrities came from various fields: actors,  directors, bandleaders, and athletes, to name but a few. Because they did not appear on the air, the Ziv Company saved any salary that their appearances would have incurred. Compensation came in the form of promoting whatever book, film, or other work the guest had coming up.

Despite the show's premise, many of the stories presented may not have been the celebrities' actual favorites. Christine Becker wrote in her book, It’s the Pictures That Got Small: Hollywood Film Stars on 1950s Television, "Production documents indicate that celebrities were asked for their favorite stories, but they had to select from a predetermined list and were not always matched up with a story they selected."

Stories presented were adaptations of literary classics, including Alice in Wonderland, Frankenstein, Dr. Jekyll & Mr. Hyde, and Oliver Twist. Not only did prestigious titles add an air of quality, but they had the financial advantage of being in the public domain, so that nothing had to be paid for the rights to broadcast them.

The half-hour time span was better suited to short stories than to novels, but Tim DeForest wrote in his book, Radio by the Book: Adaptations of Literature and Fiction on the Airwaves, "In many cases, Favorite Story managed the incredible feat of jamming a classic novel into half an hour and still giving us a rewarding experience."

Personnel
As an anthology, Favorite Story had no regular characters; the only person who appeared in the same role from one episode to another was host Ronald Colman. His presence enhanced the program's appeal to listeners and to executives and sponsors at local stations — a factor essential to having stations broadcast the show. Frederick Ziv, owner of the company that syndicated the program, said that with Colman on board, "Stations were receptive, networks were receptive, sponsors were receptive, audiences were receptive." Becker found that, besides being the host and acting in some episodes, Colman "did indeed have measurable creative input into Favorite Story", such as suggesting how the script writers should adapt the stories for radio.

Actors heard regularly in episodes included Jeff Corey, Edna Best, Lionel Stander, Vincent Price, John Beal, Howard Duff, William Conrad, and Janet Waldo. Jerome Lawrence and Robert E. Lee produced, directed, and wrote for the program. Other writers were William Froug and E. Jack Neuman. Announcers were George Barclay and True Boardman. Music was by Claude Sweeten.

See also

Academy Award Theater
Author's Playhouse
The Campbell Playhouse
Cavalcade of America
CBS Radio Workshop
The Cresta Blanca Hollywood Players
Curtain Time
Ford Theatre
General Electric Theater
Hollywood Hotel (radio program)
Lux Radio Theatre
The Mercury Theatre on the Air
The MGM Theater of the Air
The Screen Guild Theater
Screen Director's Playhouse
Stars over Hollywood
Theater Guild on the Air

References

External links

Logs
Log of episodes of Favorite Story from Audio Classics Archive
Log of episodes of Favorite Story from The Digital Deli Too
Log of episodes of Favorite Story from Jerry Haendiges Vintage Radio Logs
Log of episodes of Favorite Story from Old Time Radio Researchers Group
Log of episodes of Favorite Story from radioGOLDINdex

Streaming
Streaming episodes of Favorite Story from Dumb.com
Streaming episodes of Favorite Story from Old Time Radio Researchers Group Library

1940s American radio programs
American radio dramas
Radio programs based on works
Anthology radio series
Ziv Company radio programs
Syndicated radio programs